Julie e os Fantasmas (English title: Julie and the Phantoms) is a Brazilian musical comedy-drama television series produced by Rede Bandeirantes in partnership with Mixer and co-producer Nickelodeon Brazil. The show aired on Rede Bandeirantes from 17 October 2011 to 4 May 2012. It also aired on Nickelodeon from 20 October 2011 to 29 April 2012, with the season divided into two distinct phases: the first one, shown in 2011, and the second shown the following year.

The series stars Mariana Lessa as Julie, a teenage girl who meets three ghosts: Daniel, Felix, and Martim (played by Bruno Sigrist, Fabio Rabello, and Marcelo Ferrari, respectively). Julie subsequently forms a band with the ghosts and starts to perform regularly in her city.

The opening theme of the series, "Julie", is performed by Lu Andrade. The song was included on a CD released on 30 April 2012 by Midas Music, a label owned by Rick Bonadio, who was in charge of the musical production. During its Band broadcast, the series achieved an audience of approximately three points, an index considered good by network standards, and was well-received by critics.

The show received an APCA Trophy in the category Best Children's Program and was nominated for the Kids' Choice Awards (Argentine edition), My Nick Awards, and the International Emmy Kids Awards. In addition to being shown in its home country, the series was shown across Latin America through the Nickelodeon affiliates, and in Italy on the Super! Channel.

Synopsis
The show focuses on Julie (Mariana Lessa), a 15-year-old girl, and three ghosts: Daniel, Felix and Martim. Julie frees the musical ghosts who were trapped in a vinyl record. Shortly thereafter, Julie's life changes completely: she forms a band with the ghosts and starts performing regularly in her city. The friendly ghosts help her deal with daily problems, particularly her passion for music and her love for Nicolas.

Characters

Main
 Mariana Lessa as Juliana "Julie" Spinelli
 Bruno Sigrist as Daniel Haunt
 Fabio Rabello as Félix Haunt
 Marcelo Ferrari as Martim Haunt
 Samya Pascotto as Beatriz "Bia" Passos
 Milena Martines as Thalita Bittencourt de Toledo
 Vinícius Mazzola as Pedro "Pedrinho" Spinelli
 Michel Joelsas as Nicolas Albuquerque

Recurring
 Will Prado as Raul Spinelli, Julie's father
 Camila Raffanti as Eloísa Spinelli, Julie's mother
 Gabriel Falcão as João Paulo "JP" Guimarães
 Pedro Lucas Cruz as Thomaz Mota
 Pedro Inoue as Valter "Valtinho" Gama
 Jéssica Nakamura as Shizuko Yamada
 Netuno Trindade as Patrick

Guest
 Bruno Gissoni as Caco
 Manu Gavassi as Débora
 Gabi Lopes as Roberta
 Penélope Nova as Prof. Marta Sousa 
 NX Zero as themselves
 Kiko Zambianchi as Josias
 Roger Moreira as Chris Garcia
 Reinaldo Zavarce as himself
 Mariana Gimenez as Valeria

Episodes

Awards

References

2010s children's television series
2010s comedy-drama television series
2010s teen drama television series
2011 Brazilian television series debuts
2012 Brazilian television series endings
Brazilian children's television series
Brazilian comedy television series
Brazilian drama television series
Musical comedy television shows
Portuguese-language Nickelodeon original programming
Rede Bandeirantes original programming
Television series about fictional musicians
Television series about ghosts
Television series about teenagers